Ribiyanda Saswadimata (born 5 February 1997) is a Singaporean footballer who had played as a winger for Tanjong Pagar United in the Singapore Premier League.  He is the son of former Singapore national football player Saswadimata Dasuki.

Career statistics

Club
 

Notes

References

External links

Living people
2000 births
Singaporean footballers
Association football midfielders
Tanjong Pagar United FC players
Singapore Premier League players